In fluid dynamics the Milne-Thomson circle theorem or the circle theorem is a statement giving a new stream function for a fluid flow when a cylinder is placed into that flow. It was named after the English mathematician L. M. Milne-Thomson.

If a circle  is placed into that flow, the complex potential for the new flow is given by

 

Example
Consider a uniform irrotational flow  with velocity  flowing in the positive  direction and place an infinitely long cylinder of radius  in the flow with the center of the cylinder at the origin. Then , hence using circle theorem,

represents the complex potential of uniform flow over a cylinder.

See also 
 Potential flow
 Conformal mapping
 Velocity potential
 Milne-Thomson method for finding a holomorphic function

References 

Fluid mechanics
Fluid dynamics
Equations of fluid dynamics